Osmar Gasparini Terra (born 18 February 1950) is a Brazilian politician and physician, affiliated to the Brazilian Democratic Movement (MDB), current Minister of Citizenship and former Minister of Social and Agrarian Development.

References

|-

|-

1950 births
Living people
People from Porto Alegre
Brazilian Democratic Movement politicians
Government ministers of Brazil
University of Brasília alumni
Pontifical Catholic University of Rio Grande do Sul alumni
20th-century Brazilian physicians